Angela Andreoli (born 6 June 2006) is an Italian artistic gymnast.  She was a member of the gold medal winning teams at the 2022 Mediterranean Games and the 2022 European Championships. Individually she is the 2022 Mediterranean Games bronze medalist on vault and 2022 European bronze medalist on floor exercise.

Early life
Andreoli was born in Brescia, Italy in 2006.  She currently trains at the International Academy of Brixia.

Gymnastics career

Espoir

2017–18 
Andreoli competed at the 2017 Tournoi International in the espoir division.  She placed first in the all-around as well as on uneven bars, balance beam, and floor exercise.  In 2018 Andreoli began competing in Serie A competitions alongside her club Brixia.

2019 
Andreoli competed at the City of Jesolo Trophy as part of the "Young Italy" team; they placed fourth.  Individually Andreoli placed 16th in the all-around.  At the Italian Gold Championships she won the all-around and earned the highest scores on all apparatuses except floor exercise, where she earned the second highest score.  Andreoli ended the season competing at the Sainté Gym Cup.  She placed third in the all-around behind Ondine Achampong of Great Britain and Alizée Letrange-Mouakit of France.

Junior

2020–21 
At the 2020 Italian Gold Junior Championships Andreoli finished first.  At the 2020 Italian National Championships Andreoli placed sixth in the all-around but was the highest scoring junior athlete.

At the 2021 Flanders International Team Challenge Andreoli finished third in the all-around but helped Italy finish first in the team competition.  During event finals Andreoli had top three finishes on vault, uneven bars, and floor exercise.  At Elite Gym Massilia Andreoli helped Italy finish first as a team and individually she won gold on floor exercise.

Senior

2022 
Andreoli became age-eligible for senior competition in 2022.  She made her senior international debut at the DTB Pokal Team Challenge.  Her scores on vault, uneven bars, and floor exercise contributed towards Italy's second-place finish.  Individually Andreoli won gold on floor exercise ahead of Konnor McClain.  Andreoli next competed at the City of Jesolo Trophy.  She helped Italy finish second as a team and individually finished fourth on vault.  In June Andreoli competed at the Mediterranean Games alongside Martina Maggio, Alice D'Amato, Asia D'Amato, and Giorgia Villa.  Together they won gold in the team competition, over five points ahead of second place France.  In August Andreoli competed at the European Championships where Italy won gold as a team.  During event finals Andreoli won bronze on floor exercise behind Jessica Gadirova and teammate Maggio.  In October it was revealed that Andreoli would miss out on competing at the World Championships due to injury.

Competitive history

References

External links
 

2006 births
Living people
Italian female artistic gymnasts
Sportspeople from Brescia
European champions in gymnastics
Mediterranean Games gold medalists for Italy
Mediterranean Games bronze medalists for Italy
Mediterranean Games medalists in gymnastics
Gymnasts at the 2022 Mediterranean Games
21st-century Italian women